This article provides a grammar sketch of the Nawat or Pipil language, an endangered language spoken by the Pipils of western El Salvador and Nicarao people of Nicaragua. It belongs to the Nahua group within the Uto-Aztecan language family. There also exists a brief typological overview of the language that summarizes the language's most salient features of general typological interest in more technical terms.

Sounds

Basic phonemes and word stress

Historically there was phonemic vowel length in Nawat, that is, words could have different meanings depending on whether each vowel in them was long or short. This distinction may be extinct for present-day speakers.

The /n/ phoneme has various allophones, as follows:

Most words are stressed on the second to last syllable. Some are stressed on the last syllable: these include a few lexical compounds such as tenkal 'door, patio' (from ten 'mouth' and kal 'house'), certain prefixed or reduplicated monosyllables such as (optionally) kajkal 'houses', and many diminutives in -tzin or -chin. There are also words in these categories with regular penultimate stress.

Phonotactics

Secondary semivowels

Reduplication
Reduplication is a morphological process employed in several parts of the grammatical system, which is characterized in phonological terms. Nawat reduplication takes the form of repetition of a word's first syllable (actually only the (C)V part thereof). So for example, a reduplication of kunet 'child' is ku-kunet 'children', and a derivative of the root petz- 'smooth' is pe-petz-ka 'a kind of small, silvery fish', local Spanish pepesca.

Another more productive variety of reduplication involves adding a j after the reduplication, e.g., ku-j-kunet 'children', pe-j-petz-naj plural of petz-naj 'smooth, naked'. Generalizing, plain reduplication (without j) is governed by lexical criteria. J-reduplication, on the contrary, is used by grammatical rules that:

Noun phrase

Determiners and quantifiers

The determiners (except for ne) and quantifiers may be used pronominally, i.e., without a noun head, or preceding the noun they determine or quantify, e.g., ne takat 'the man', ini techan 'this village', miak kal 'many houses', ume siwat 'two women'.

Possession

The prefixes shown below are attached to nouns to express who they 'belong' to, e.g., nu-yak 'my nose', i-eltiw 'his/her sister', tu-mistun 'our cat', mu-techan 'your village'.

Some nouns are always 'possessed', so that it is bad Nawat just to say *se yak 'a nose' or *ne eltiw 'the sister': instead one has to say se iyak 'one her-nose', ne nueltiw 'the my-sister', or whatever possessive form fits the context best. These include most nouns expressing either a part of the body or a member of one's family.

Other nouns can occur either with or without a possessor. Some of these have two different forms, one (the absolute form) for use without a possessive prefix and the other (the possessed form) for use with a possessive prefix. These 'states' may be indicated by different suffixes, e.g., ne kune-t 'the child' → ne nu-kune-w 'my child; ne sin-ti 'the maize' → ne nu-sin 'my maize'; ne es-ti 'the blood' → ne nu-es-yu 'my blood'. When both states of the noun are zero-marked (like mistun and techan), the noun is 'invariable'.

The possessive indices tell us the person and number of the possessor, which may be specified by a noun phrase following the possessed noun. When that happens, the possessed normally has the third-person index, e.g., ne i-mistun ne piltzin 'the boy's cat' (literally: 'his-cat the boy').

There is an alternative way to express this, if the noun is alienable, using the preposition pal or the relational ipal: ne mistun pal ne piltzin ('the cat of the boy'). Even with an inalienable possession, it is possible to say ne inan pal ne piltzin ('the his-mother of the boy').

The plural
Nouns may be made plural by two different procedures:

For possessed forms:

Some word that may accompany a noun in the noun phrase, such as the determiners ne, ini, uni, are invariable for number, e.g., uni mistun 'that cat', uni mijmistun 'those cats'. On the other hand, nouns accompanied by a quantifier that is plural in meaning need not themselves be pluralized morphologically, e.g., ume mistun 'two cats'.

Adjectives

Adjectives used attributively can precede or follow the noun, e.g., se selek iswat or se iswat selek 'a tender leaf' (selek 'tender, fresh, green', iswat 'leaf').

There is considerable variation regarding how to mark plural number in noun phrases containing an adjective. As long as some element or other in the noun phrase marks the phrase as plural, it seems not to matter which one, or even how many elements are (redundantly) pluralized, though there some speakers seem to indicate a preference for (1) marking plurality in the first possible component, and (2) avoiding redundancy, thus chijchiltik tzaput or tzajtzaput chiltik, but ume chiltik tzaput or ume tzaput chiltik.

Pronouns and adverbs
No noun phrase is marked for case, and this is just as true of the pronouns, which have each a single form that can perform any function in the sentence.

Case, prepositions and relationals

Noun phrases in core grammatical functions are not marked for case. To specify other roles, a preposition or a relational may precede a noun phrase. The main prepositions are:

All the above prepositions derive diachronically from relationals. In some cases the preposition merely represents an abbreviation of the relational by omitting the i- prefix.

Relationals are quasi-nouns expressing some relationship (sometimes spatial, but not always) to their possessive complement. For example, nu-jpak, meaning 'on or over me', consists of the relational (i)jpak conveying 'position above' with a first person singular possessor. Some relationals are shown in third-person-singular forms in the following table:

Basic verb morphology

Subject and object indices

The following table shows the prefixes that serve to index the subject and object, respectively. (Note that in the subjunctive mood the second-person subject prefix takes the special form shi-.)

Verbs with a plural subject take a plural suffix: basically -t except in the subjunctive when -kan is used:

Transitive verbs take, in addition, an object prefix after the subject prefix. The third-singular object prefix ki- is shortened to -k- when preceded by any of the subject prefixes ni-, ti- or shi-. This is illustrated here by the present (indicative) and subjunctive of an intransitive verb (panu 'pass') and a transitive verb with a third-person-singular object (-pia 'have'):

A few examples follow:

Tenses
Tenses (so called for convenience although they include aspect or mood categories) are characterized by distinct suffixes. The plural suffix -t combines with each tense suffix to give us plural tense endings, also shown here.

Conjugation classes

The verbs classified as Class I in this table end in a or i in the present and subjunctive, but that vowel is lost in the past (which ends in -ki in this class) and in the perfect (all perfects are in -tuk). Class II verbs, which end in a, i or u, retain this in all forms, and form their past in -k. Class III differs from Class I only in that there is no past suffix at all, only the bare stem. Class IV verbs end in -ia or -ua in the present, but lose their final a in all the other tenses (including the subjunctive), and add a j in the past and perfect.

Class I includes a sub-class of mutating stems that end in the present and subjunctive in -wa, -ua, -ya or -ia. These change to -j-, -uj-, -sh- and -ish-, respectively, in the past and perfect.

There are very few truly irregular verbs. The present and subjunctive of yawi 'go' and witz 'come' are given in full here:

Directional prefix

The directional prefix wal- 'towards the speaker' follows subject indices but precedes object indices (in transitive verbs) except for ki-. It has the morphological peculiarity that when preceded by ni-, ti-, shi- or ki- both i and w are omitted, leaving nal-, tal-, shal- and kal-. When ni-/ti-/shi-, ki- and wal- would all come together, the ki- component disappears altogether, so that nal-, tal- and shal- do double duty as transitive (= ni- + ki- + wal-, etc.) markers as well as intransitive (= ni- + wal-, etc.) ones. The plural object marker kin- is split in two when combined with wal-. The following examples illustrate.

Syntax

Non-verbal predicates

Intransitive and transitive
Most Nawat verbs belong clearly to one of two major formal types: intransitive or transitive.

Here, intransitive verbs are those that cannot have an object and corresponding object prefixes—while transitive verbs are those that must have an object and object prefix. Neither subject nor object noun phrases need be present in the sentence, but whether explicit or implicit, the corresponding subject and object indices must. (This statement rests on the convention of considering the index for a third-person subject to take the form of 'zero'.)

Some of the most common intransitive and transitive Nawat verbs are given below:

Valency changes
There are a number of means, grammatical or lexical, for changing a verb's valency (the number of arguments it takes) and thereby effectively 'converting' it to a different transitivity type. A considerable number of lexical pairs exist consisting of two related verbs, one intransitive and the other transitive:

Apart from such purely lexical alternations, there are two prefixes with specific grammatical functions which, attached to transitive verbs, reduce their surface valency (when they are used, there is no object prefix):

Unmarked oblique complements
Some Nawat verbs have a complement that does not correspond to any index in the verb. These include the following:

Verb sequences
There are several ways for a verb to be subordinated to another (preceding) verb.

 If the verbs have different subjects:

 When both verbs share the same subject:

Periphrastic TAM constructions
The serial construction also serves as the structure for a number of compound expressions of tense, aspect and modality, e.g.

But there are also constructions, or variant expressions, that depart from this pattern somewhat.

The invariable word katka, which means 'was' or 'before, in the past', may occur following a verb form to establish past or habitual reference, e.g., inte kimati katka 'he didn't know'.

Negation

Negative particles immediately precede either a verb or a non-verbal predicate. Basically there are three of them:

They also combine with pronouns and adverbs to yield other negative expressions, e.g., (in)te (t)atka 'nothing', (in)te aka 'no one', (in)te keman 'never', nian aka 'no one at all, and no one', maka keman 'never ever!', etc.: Inte nikmati tatka (datka) 'I know nothing', Maka shikilwi aka! 'Do not tell anyone!'

Phase
Two suffixes, -a and -uk, lend different phasal nuances to a predicate, i.e., they add certain temporal (or related) notions, expressing that a situation has already been reached (with -a) or that it still obtains (with -uk). The more common phasal suffix, -a, is also used simply to place emphasis on the predicate so marked. Compare for example:

In negative sentences, the phrasal suffixes are added to the negative particle, for example:

Questions
Yes-no questions are not differentiated grammatically from the corresponding statements. They may be affirmative, e.g., Taja tikmati? 'Do you know?', or negative, e.g., Inte tikitak kanka witz? 'Didn't you see where he was coming from?'

For replying affirmatively to yes-no questions, one may use E / Ej / Eje 'Yes', and sometimes Kia 'That's right' (literally 'So'). But it is equally common to respond using the appropriately inflected form of the main verb of the question, e.g.. (offering a cookie, for example) Tikneki se? – Nikneki 'Would you like one? – I would', Weli titaketza Nawat? – Weli 'Can you speak Nawat? – I can'. The standard negative answer is Inte / Te / Tesu 'No', or again, the verb of the question negated: Tikitak uni takat ka ne? – Te nikitak 'Did you see that man over there? – I did not'. Other idiomatic responses include Nusan 'Also', Teika inte! or Taika te! 'Why not!' and Inte / Te / Tesu nikmati 'I don't know'.

Wh-questions are formed with a wh-word, which usually immediately precedes the predicate (verbal or non-verbal.

Indirect questions are introduced by either (a)su 'if, whether' or a wh-expression, depending on the kind of question.

Coordination

Wan or iwan (which is also the preposition and relational 'with') serves as an all-purpose coordinating conjunction. There seem not to be any specialised native words for 'but' and 'or' (unless ush 'or' is one), and the Spanish words pero and o are sometimes used. N(i)an 'nor' may be used to coordinate negative statements. Mal or melka 'although, even though' can form adversative clauses, e.g., Niyaw niyaw, mal-te/melka te nikneki 'I will go, although I don't want to'. Nusan 'also' is common, e.g., Yaja nusan walaj 'She also came'; its negative counterpart is simply nusan te... 'not...either', e.g., Naja nusan te nikneki nitakwa 'I don't want to eat either'.

Subordination

subordinate clauses are introduced by subordinators; the following table illustrates some of the most common:

Relative clauses, which always follow (rather than precede) their head, may be simply juxtaposed clauses, or introduced by the article ne, the general complementizer ka or the interrogative pronoun ká (the last two being distinguished phonologically in various ways in the dialects). Headless relative clauses are introduced by interrogative pronouns.

Lexicon

General
As regards origin, the Pipil lexicon consists of the following components:

 The central component (by far the largest): native or inherited vocabulary, nearly all shared (with minor variations) with Mexican Nahuatl, though the lexeme pool is patently smaller than that of Classical Nahuatl)
 A small number of loans from surrounding indigenous languages
 Loans from Spanish, the proportion of which fluctuates depending on the speaker and register, and includes loans of varying antiquity and degree of integration
 Neologisms proposed by some speakers or writers based on extending the native vocabulary component
 Loans from Mexican Nahuatl varieties proposed by some speakers or writers

There exist mechanisms of native origin for the creation of derived and compound words. No doubt these were more actively used in the language's past, since some such mechanisms are only attested in fossilized form. In more recent periods of the language, use of such procedures appears to have decreased, and with them the productivity of the procedures themselves.

Derivation
A selection of well-attested derivational affixes follows:

Ideophones
Ideophones are a distinct set of lexical items, often denoting some process that is directly perceived by the senses (such as a kind of sound or visual experience), which enter into a special range of language-specific grammatical patterns. Nawat is one of many languages possessing such items and the associated patterns, which in this case are 'expressive' verb formations. The root form of a typical Nawat ideophone is a CVCV sequence, e.g., -chala-, -china-, -kelu-, -kina-, -kumu-, -kwala-, -tapa-, -tikwi-, -tzaya-, -tzili-, -tzutzu-.  These roots are not words and only acquire full meaning when they enter into one or another of the derivational patterns for Nawat ideophones. Some at least are probably onomatopoeic in origin.

The four most common morphological patterns for such Nawat verb formations are the following (R represents the ideophone root, rR a reduplicated root without j):

Incorporation

Classical Nahuatl is characterized by widespread use of the device of incorporation. This is a grammatical and lexical phenomenon found in different guises in many languages. The Nahuatl system is quite well known to linguists because it is often cited as an example in linguistic literature.

Briefly, in incorporation a lexeme potentially representing one of a verb's semantic arguments or adjuncts, rather than forming a separate grammatical constituent is allowed to be attached directly to the verb itself thereby forming a compound verb. In Nahuatl this incorporated lexeme is prefixed to the verb.

In Pipil, examples of this kind of structure also occur. However, their use is far less widespread than in Classical Nahuatl, and the process is barely (if at all) productive. Therefore existing examples rather resemble ordinary lexicalized compounds. Furthermore, most of those used involve one of a specific, limited range of incorporating elements that show considerable grammaticalization, and are therefore perhaps best viewed, in the Pipil context at least, simply as derivational prefixes.

The grammaticalization of these elements manifests itself in form, meaning and function. The Pipil forms of some of these incorporating stems are somewhat specialized phonologically; moreover, some of the forms used for incorporation no longer have corresponding full-word counterparts.

Most of the narrow set of widely used incorporating elements belong to a single semantic set, that of body parts. While in some compounds the literal meanings of such elements subsists, in many others they only retain a broadly metaphorical sense, while in some it is quite difficult to perceive any particular meaning at all.

A selection of Pipil 'incorporation prefixes' with illustrations of some of their uses follows:

Examples of sentences containing incorporation compounds:

Other compounds

Lexical stems may combine to form other kinds of lexical compounds. Compounding mechanisms may still exist in the spontaneous language use of some speakers (to the extent that they still have spontaneous language use) but there is limited evidence for their natural, productive application.

Where traditional compounds are concerned, much of what has beensaid about incorporation is equally applicable. In fact, the same lexical combining forms that predominate in incorporation verbs often reappear in other compounds. Since these tend to be monosyllables with a low level of semantic specificity, we may call them 'light elements' and the compounds they form 'light compounds'.

Compounds containing more than one 'heavy' lexeme are rather rarer, and when new ones are proposed it is perhaps most often in response to the pressure of Spanish, i.e., in attempts to find a 'native' equivalent to a Spanish word in order to avoid a loanword. In the following table, '%' preceding a word indicates a neologism (proposed by at least one native speaker).

Loanwords

When speakers fail to find an adequate word or expression in Nawat they may (1) employ a circumlocution (for example, they could call the kitchen kan titamanat '(the place) where we cook'), (2) borrow a Spanish word or expression (e.g., ne cosinaj 'the cocina' (kitchen)), or (3) simply code-switch. However, when we speak of loanwords we have in mind items of foreign origin that have become habitual elements of Nawat usage and may also have undergone adaptation as a result.

With one possible exception (pashalua 'go for a walk, take time off work' < *pasyarua < Spanish pasear + the non-productive verb suffix -ua), verbs can only be borrowed into Nawat from other languages in an invariable form based on the Spanish infinitive. Such forms cannot be conjugated directly. Instead, they must be preceded by the Nawat verb -chiwa 'make, do' to form compound expressions, e.g., from Spanish escribir 'write' we have Nawat nikchiwa escribir (contracted to nikcha escribir) 'I write' (literally 'I do escribir' ), tikchiwket or tikchijket escribir 'we wrote' (lit. 'we did escribir' ), etc.

Dialect variation

Dialects
Pipil internal dialect variation is incompletely documented at present. While recognising the existence of important gaps in our knowledge (which may or may not ever be filled, as the last native speakers pass on), we do know of two well-defined dialect areas, at least as far as the department of Sonsonate is concerned, which may tentatively be called Upland and Lowland. The Upland dialect area includes the towns of Izalco and Nahuizalco, the Lowland area those of Santo Domingo de Guzmán and Cuisnahuat. Present knowledge also includes some points of differentiation between Santo Domingo and Cuisnahuat. Thus for practical purposes we are chiefly able to speak of three known varieties: Izalco, Cuisnahuat and Santo Domingo.

Phonological variation
 The /k/ phoneme has voiced allophones more frequently in Lowland, especially in Santo Domingo.
 Syllable-final /l/ (as in kal 'house', chiltik 'red') is sometimes devoiced; no clear dialect distribution can be formulated for this trait, however.
 Pre-consonantal /s/ following /i/ (as in mistun 'cat') is often palatalized; again no precise distribution can be stated.
 In some areas the evolution of secondary semivowels described above for unstressed syllables also takes place in stressed syllables, the stress then falling on the vowel following the semivowel giving rise to word-final stress, e.g., /maltia/ 'bathes' → [mal'tja] (rather than [mal'tija]), and /kuat/ 'snake' → ['kwat] (instead of ['kuwat], ['guwat]). This feature has been attested for Nahuizalco and for the department of Ahuachapan, but a complete isogloss remains to be drawn.

Morphological variation
 The plural prefixes with a nasal element (in(h)-, kin(h)-) tend to be avoided by some speakers in Santo Domingo, but this appears to be a new development.
 The sequence /nm/ in second person plural forms (anmejemet, anmu-) is variously altered: amejemet, amu-, anhejemet, awmejemet, mejemet...).
 For Izalco nikan 'here', ashan 'now, today', nemá 'later', kwakuni 'then' and ijkiuni 'like that', Santo Domingo has nin, an, nemanha, kunij ([g-]) and kiunij ([k-]).
 'What' and 'who':

 There are many differences between the assignment of individual verbs to one or another conjugation class, most noticeably affecting past tense formation.
 The verb yawi 'go' possesses both longer and shorter forms (e.g., niyaw versus niu, nu...), but the latter vary between dialects.
 The verb -chiwa 'make, do' possesses full and short forms (e.g., nikchiwa versus nikcha), but -cha is more general in Upland dialects.
 The verb -maka 'give' and derivatives (such as -namaka 'sell') are normally contracted to monosyllabic -ma in Upland speech.
 Some sporadic differences in verb valencies, e.g., in Izalco tajtani 'ask' is intransitive, in Santo Domingo transitive.
 General negative particle: Upland inte, Lowland te(su).
 Miscellaneous differences in the forms of some words, e.g.

Syntactic variation
 Somewhat different periphrastic tense constructions are found in Upland and Lowland dialects.
 Izalco dialect often adds ne to subordinators, e.g., kwak ne 'when', kan ne 'where', tay ne 'what', pal ne 'in order for'.

Lexical variation
A few examples of inter-dialectal lexical differences follow:

Spelling systems

Among the works published since the early twentieth century until the present in which the Pipil language is described or transcribed at any length, rarely do two authors fully coincide in the spelling conventions they use. The spelling system used in this article is that employed in recently produced materials associated with the Nawat language recovery initiative IRIN. The following table allows this to be compared to with other spelling systems, ordered approximately in reverse chronological order.

See also

Nawat language
Nawat language (typological overview)

References

 Arauz, Próspero (1960). El pipil de la región de los Itzalcos. (Edited by Pedro Geoffroy Rivas.) San Salvador: Ministerio de Cultura.
 Calvo Pacheco, Jorge Alfredo (2000). Vocabulario castellano-pipil pípil-kastíyan. Izalco, El Salvador.
 Campbell, Lyle. (1985). The Pipil language of El Salvador. Mouton grammar library (No. 1). Berlin: Mouton Publishers.  (U.S.), .
 Geoffroy Rivas, Pedro (1969). El nawat de Cuscatlán: Apuntes para una gramática. San Salvador: Ministerio de Educación.
 King, Alan R. (2004a). ¡Conozcamos el náhuat! El Salvador: IRIN.
 King, Alan R. (2004b). Gramática elemental del náhuat. El Salvador: IRIN.
 King, A.R. (typescript). Léxico básico náhuat.
 Lemus, Jorge Ernesto (1997a). "Formación de palabras y léxico pipil." In: Estudios lingüísticos. San Salvador: Concultura.
 Lemus, Jorge Ernesto (1997b). "Alfabeto pipil: una propuesta." In: Estudios lingüísticos. San Salvador: Concultura.
 Lemus, Jorge Ernesto (1998). "Fonología métrica del pipil." In: Memoria: IV Congreso Lingüístico/I Simposio "Pueblos Indígenas de El Salvador y sus fronteras".  San Salvador: Concultura.
 Lemus, Jorge Ernesto ([1988]). "A sketch grammar of the Nahuat spoken in Santo Domingo de Guzmán." Bachelor's thesis, Universidad Evangélica de El Salvador. (unpublished typescript)
 Ramírez Vázquez, Genaro (undated typescript). "Pequeña guía para introducción al náhuat."
 Todd, Juan G. (1953). Notas del náhuat de Nahuizalco. San Salvador: Editorial "Nosotros".

Grammar
Native American grammars
Indigenous languages of Central America
Mesoamerican languages
Endangered Uto-Aztecan languages